The ambassador of the United Kingdom to Egypt is the United Kingdom's foremost diplomatic representative in Egypt, and head of the UK's diplomatic mission in Egypt.  The official title is His Britannic Majesty's Ambassador to the Arab Republic of Egypt.

Under the British occupation of Egypt (1882–1956), the British consul-general, high commissioner, or ambassador effectively ruled Egypt.

List of heads of mission

Consuls-General
 1786–1796: George Baldwin (post abolished in 1793 but letter did not reach Baldwin until 1796)
 1803–1804: Charles Lock (appointed but died en route to Egypt)
 1804–1815: Ernest Missett (Agent, then Consul-General)
1815–1827: Henry Salt
1827–1833: John Barker (acting until 1829)
1833–1839: Patrick Campbell
1839–1841: Sir George Lloyd Hodges
1841–1846: Charles John Barnett
1846–1853: Charles Murray
1853–1858: Frederick Wright-Bruce
1858–1865: Robert Colquhoun
1865–1876: Edward Stanton
1876–1879: Hon. Hussey Vivian
1879–1883: Edward Malet
1883–1907: Sir Evelyn Baring, Lord Cromer
1907–1911: Sir Eldon Gorst with rank of Minister Plenipotentiary
1911–1914: Herbert Kitchener, 1st Viscount Kitchener with rank of Minister Plenipotentiary

High Commissioners
1914–1915: Sir Milne Cheetham
1915–1917: Sir Henry McMahon
1917–1919: Sir Reginald Wingate
1919–1925: Edmund Allenby, 1st Viscount Allenby
1925–1929: George Lloyd, 1st Baron Lloyd
1929–1933: Sir Percy Loraine
1934–1936: Sir Miles Lampson

Ambassadors
1936–1946: Sir Miles Lampson
1946–1950: Sir Ronald Campbell
1950–1955: Sir Ralph Stevenson
1955–1956: Sir Humphrey Trevelyan
1956–1959: Break in relations due to Suez Crisis
1959–1961: Sir Colin Crowe (Chargé d'affaires)
1961–1964: Sir Harold Beeley
1964–1965: Sir George Middleton
1965–1967: Break in relations over Rhodesia
1967–1969: Sir Harold Beeley
1969–1972: Sir Richard Beaumont
1972–1975: Sir Philip Adams
1975–1979: Sir Willie Morris
1979–1985: Sir Michael Weir
1985–1987: Sir Alan Urwick
1987–1992: Sir James Adams
1992–1995: Christopher Long
1995–1999: Sir David Blatherwick
1999–2001: Sir Graham Boyce
2001–2003: Sir John Sawers
2003–2007: Sir Derek Plumbly
2007–2011: Sir Dominic Asquith
2011–2014: James Watt
2014–2018: John Casson
2018-2021: Sir Geoffrey Adams

2021–: Gareth Bayley

See also
Egypt–United Kingdom relations
List of ambassadors of Egypt to the United Kingdom
 British foreign policy in the Middle East

References

 
United Kingdom
Egypt
Egypt
 
UK diplomats